Philautus abditus is a species of frog in the family Rhacophoridae. It is found in the highlands of central Vietnam (Kon Tum and Gia Lai Provinces) as well as in extreme northeastern Cambodia (Ratanakiri Province). The specific name abditus is Latin for "hidden" or "concealed" and refers to the black spots on the legs that are concealed while the legs are flexed.

Description
Adult males measure  and adult females  in snout–vent length. The overall appearance is stocky. The snout is rounded. The tympanum is present but completely hidden by skin; the supratympanic fold is weakly curved. The fingers and toes bear round discs; the toes are extensively webbed. Skin is smooth dorsally and laterally but granular ventrally. Preserved specimens are dorsally pinkish brown or gray. The anterior and the posterior surfaces of the thighs bear large, black spots that are not visible when the legs are flexed. Males have a median vocal sac.

Habitat and conservation
Reproduction is probably direct (i.e., there is no free-living larval stage). This species is potentially threatened by forest and stream degradation. The Cambodian locality is within the Virachey National Park.

References

abditus
Frogs of Asia
Amphibians of Cambodia
Amphibians of Vietnam
Amphibians described in 1999
Taxa named by Ilya Darevsky
Taxa named by Robert F. Inger
Taxa named by Nikolai Loutseranovitch Orlov
Taxonomy articles created by Polbot